The City of Fountain is a home rule municipality located in El Paso County, Colorado, United States. The city population was 29,802 at the 2020 United States Census, a +15.31% increase since the 2010 United States Census. Fountain is a part of the Colorado Springs, CO Metropolitan Statistical Area and the Front Range Urban Corridor.

Fountain and the Colorado Springs suburbs Security and Widefield make up the "Fountain Valley" community.

History
Fountain was built in 1859 as a railroad shipping center for local ranches and farms. The town was named for Fountain Creek and was incorporated in 1900.

A train wreck, "The Blast", as it is now known, occurred in Fountain during the spring of 1888. Just after three in the morning on May 14, 1888, a freight train carrying eighteen tons of explosives and a passenger train collided in the city. The accident killed three people: Charles F. Smith, a Fountain lumber dealer originally from Keokuk, Iowa, Henry Hutchins, a Fountain merchant and Mrs. Sarah Widrig a local hat maker from Fountain. (There are conflicting reports of others who may not have died immediately, but later as a result of injuries from the crash.)

The blast from the collision created a very loud explosion that could be heard from miles away. The crash destroyed a nearby church, a grocery store and created a large crater in the ground forty feet in diameter and fifteen feet deep.

The cause of the wreck was attributed to a pair of unruly vagrants who were kicked off of the freight train north of Fountain in Colorado Springs. After an investigation by The Rocky Mountain News, it was later reported that one of the two vagrants murdered a third man, Frank Shipman, on the freight train. Shipman was returning from visiting his brother in Pueblo, Colorado. The unidentified vagrants and Shipman had been arguing and Shipman was struck hard in the head killing him. The men attempted to dispose of Shipman's dead body and cover-up the crime by disconnecting the train car Shipman's body was in. The train car Shipman's body was in, three other train cars carrying the explosive naphtha, and the caboose of the freight train were disconnected by the men and sent southbound towards Fountain. Meanwhile, a passenger train was traveling northbound on the same tracks. The collision followed. Thirty riders on board the northbound passenger train were able to escape the locomotive before the collision thanks to a frantic warning from the conductor. Twenty-eight people were injured. The vagrants suspected at the root of Shipman's murder and the train wreck were never found and no one was ever charged with a crime.

"The Blast" remains an important event in the city's history. It is commemorated with an annual street dance held at Fountain's City Hall Plaza each July.

In 1999, Fountain was chosen as "America's Millennium City" by The New York Times. Fountain was named an "All-America City" in 2002 by the National Civic League. The city is the home of Pikes Peak International Raceway.

In 2008, in a controversial move, the city of Fountain purchased a  ranch, the H2O Ranch in Custer County, for $3.5 million.  The city was interested in the prime water rights on the property totaling  a year.  Fountain is in the process of drying out the ranch and moving through the water courts to actually receive some of that water.  They claim that they should be able to successfully receive 600 of that  after the water courts have made their decisions.  It is expected that Fountain will separate the water from the ranch and then sell the ranch separately.

In 2014, Cop Car began filming in Fountain.

In 2020, Fountain water was considered safe to drink after a long running contamination problem with PFCs (perflourinated compounds) being leaked into the water table by the nearby Air Force base.  According to a recent study, PFCs have been shown to cause penile shrinkage.

Geography
Fountain is located at  (38.693787, -104.698156).

At the 2020 United States Census, the town had a total area of  including  of water. The eponymous Fountain Creek flows south through the city.

Demographics

As of the census of 2000, there were 15,197 people, 5,039 households, and 4,061 families residing in the city. The racial makeup of the city was 75.07% White, 8.74% African American, 1.41% Native American, 2.01% Asian, 0.55% Pacific Islander, 6.71% from other races, and 5.50% from two or more races. Hispanic or Latino of any race were 15.06% of the population.

There were 5,039 households, out of which 49.2% had children under the age of 18 living with them, 61.7% were married couples living together, 13.6% had a female householder with no husband present, and 19.4% were non-families. 14.8% of all households were made up of individuals, and 3.8% had someone living alone who was 65 years of age or older. The average household size was 3.01 and the average family size was 3.33.

In the city, the population was spread out, with 34.5% under the age of 18, 8.8% from 18 to 24, 34.3% from 25 to 44, 17.0% from 45 to 64, and 5.3% who were 65 years of age or older. The median age was 29 years. For every 100 females, there were 98.3 males. For every 100 females age 18 and over, there were 95.1 males.

The median income for a household in the city was $42,121, and the median income for a family was $44,735. Males had a median income of $31,192 versus $24,000 for females. The per capita income for the city was $15,975. About 5.9% of families and 8.3% of the population were below the poverty line, including 10.6% of those under age 18 and 14.7% of those age 65 or over.

Transportation
Fountain has a municipal run bus that links the city with Pikes Peak State College. Fountain is also part of the Bustang network, which provides it intercity transportation. It is along the Lamar-Pueblo-Colorado Springs Outrider line.

Notable people
Chase Headley, MLB – New York Yankees
Peter La Farge, singer-songwriter ("The Ballad of Ira Hayes"), raised and buried in Fountain
Phil Loadholt, NFL – Minnesota Vikings
Jon Watts, film director
Pete Nelson, tree house designer and builder

See also

Colorado
Bibliography of Colorado
Index of Colorado-related articles
Outline of Colorado
List of counties in Colorado
List of municipalities in Colorado
List of places in Colorado
List of statistical areas in Colorado
Front Range Urban Corridor
South Central Colorado Urban Area
Colorado Springs, CO Metropolitan Statistical Area
Fountain-Fort Carson High School
Mesa Ridge High School

References

External links

City of Fountain website
CDOT map of the City of Fountain

 
Cities in El Paso County, Colorado
Cities in Colorado